Beach Park is a village in Benton and Waukegan townships of Lake County, Illinois, United States. Per the 2020 census, the population was 14,249.

Geography
Beach Park is located at  (42.423763, -87.847753).

Major streets
  Green Bay Road
  Sheridan Road
 Kenosha Road
 21st Street
 29th Street
 33rd Street
 Lewis Avenue
 Wadsworth Road
 Beach Road
 Yorkhouse Road
 Blanchard Road

Demographics

2020 census

Note: the US Census treats Hispanic/Latino as an ethnic category. This table excludes Latinos from the racial categories and assigns them to a separate category. Hispanics/Latinos can be of any race.

2000 Census
As of the census of 2000, there were 10,072 people, 3,636 households, and 2,727 families residing in the village. The racial makeup of the village was 85.31% White, 4.54% African American, 0.28% Native American, 1.49% Asian, 0.03% Pacific Islander, 6.12% from other races, and 2.24% from two or more races. Hispanic or Latino of any race were 13.58% of the population.

There were 3,636 households, out of which 36.3% had children under the age of 18 living with them, 60.7% were married couples living together, 10.8% had a female householder with no husband present, and 25.0% were non-families. 20.5% of all households were made up of individuals, and 6.7% had someone living alone who was 65 years of age or older. The average household size was 2.77 and the average family size was 3.21.

In the village, the population was spread out, with 27.0% under the age of 18, 7.7% from 18 to 24, 29.9% from 25 to 44, 25.1% from 45 to 64, and 10.2% who were 65 years of age or older. The median age was 37 years. For every 100 females, there were 98.8 males. For every 100 females age 18 and over, there were 96.3 males.

The median income for a household in the village was $56,553, and the median income for a family was $65,064. Males had a median income of $42,982 versus $32,412 for females. The per capita income for the village was $23,803. About 3.5% of families and 3.7% of the population were below the poverty line, including 7.1% of those under age 18 and none of those age 65 or over.

Illinois Beach State Park
Beach Park is the home to the South Beach section of Illinois Beach State Park, which is otherwise located in Winthrop Harbor. The beach was originally part of Camp Logan, a rifle range developed by the Illinois National Guard in 1892. In World War I and World War II it served as a rifle range for the Great Lakes Naval Training Station. The range remained in operation until 1973, when it was transferred to the Illinois Department of Conservation.  In 1950, the Illinois Dunes Preservation Society was established to maintain the natural qualities of the beach. With the help of the Illinois Department of Conservation the area south of Beach Road was established as the state's first natural preserve. The northern beach, between Beach Road and the Wisconsin state border, was obtained between 1971 and 1982.

The south beach is now home of the Illinois Beach Resort and Conference Center. The North Point Marina is at the north beach. This is Illinois' newest and largest marina and the largest freshwater marina in the United States.

More than 650 species of plants have been recorded in the dunes area alone, including dozens of types of colorful wildflowers.

On May 9, 2000, the area encompassing Illinois Beach State Park and North Point Marina was officially designated as the Cullerton Complex in honor of William J. Cullerton, Sr., war hero, avid environmentalist and long-time friend of conservation.

Schools 
Beach Park School District #3 schools are Beach Park Middle School, Howe Elementary, Kenneth Murphy Elementary, Newport Elementary, and Oak Crest Elementary. Our Lady of Humility School is a Catholic school that opened in 1958. High School age students typically attend Zion-Benton Township High School.

Public safety
The village of Beach Park is policed by the Lake County Sheriff's Office.  The village has contracted with the Sheriff's Office to provide additional Deputy Sheriff personnel to patrol the village during the day.  These deputies are able to call on the resources of multiple deputies, and the members of the Zion, Waukegan and Gurnee police departments should an emergency require it.  The village has allowed the deputies to use the Village Hall as a small sub-station, which limits the time deputies are out of the area.  Previously, the deputies had to return to Waukegan or Libertyville for paperwork issues.

Beach Park is provided fire and EMS protection 24/7 by the Beach Park Fire Protection District, the Winthrop Harbor Fire Protection District and the Newport Township Fire Protection District . The Beach Park Fire Protection District provides 90% of the village with fire and EMS services. (Consolidation of the Beach Park Fire Department and Zion Fire Department are underway, changing these demographics over the 2019 census year) All three districts, have signed Auto Aid Agreements with each other which is assistance dispatched automatically by contractual agreement between two communities or fire districts.

In early 2006, the Beach Park Fire Protection District received voter support for a nominal tax increase.  This increase made full-time firefighter/paramedics a reality.  The department was also able to lower the Insurance Services Organization (ISO) rating to a 3.  This is one of the lowest in the area and saves residents on homeowners and renter's insurance.  The Beach Park Fire Department is taking positive steps by replacing older fire equipment.  This will ensure that the residents receive good fire response by newer apparatus.

All departments which provide fire and emergency medical services are part of the MABAS Mutual Aid program.  This program, funded by member agencies, provides assistance from the local region all the way to national resources.

Notable person

 Erik Darnell, driver with NASCAR

References

External links
Village of Beach Park
 

Villages in Illinois
Villages in Lake County, Illinois
Populated places established in 1989
Majority-minority cities and towns in Lake County, Illinois